The 1996 Tickford 500 was an endurance motor race for 5.0 Litre Touring Cars complying with CAMS Group 3A regulations. The event was held at the Sandown International Motor Raceway in Victoria, Australia on 8 September 1996. Race distance was 161 laps of the 3.1 km circuit, a total of 499 km. It was the 31st running of the Sandown touring car endurance race. 25,000 spectators attended the race.  

The race was won by Craig Lowndes and Greg Murphy driving a Holden VR Commodore.

Results

Race statistics
 Pole position: Craig Lowndes, 1:12.9694 
 Starters: 22 
 Race time of winning car: 3h 25m 50.1828s 
 Winning margin: 1.5144s 
 Fastest lap: Craig Lowndes, 1:12.9941 (new lap record)

See also
1996 Australian Touring Car season

References

Further reading
 Redemption, Tickford Sandown 500, The Great Race 1996, Chevron Publishing Group, pages 46 to 55

External links
 1996 Sandown 500 - Full Race, www.youtube.com

Motorsport at Sandown
Tickford 500
Pre-Bathurst 500